Hip Hip Hurrah! is a 1987 Danish-Norwegian-Swedish drama film directed by Kjell Grede. The film is named after the painting with the same name. At the 23rd Guldbagge Awards Grede won the award for Best Director and Lene Brøndum won the award for Best Actress. The film was selected as the Swedish entry for the Best Foreign Language Film at the 60th Academy Awards, but was not accepted as a nominee.

History 
The film presents the general background of the Skagen Painters and everything that attracted them to gather in Skagen but it is P.S. Krøyer (Stellan Skarsgård) who is the centre of attraction. It shows how he inspires the other painters to create ever better paintings while his wife Marie is considered to be the most beautiful woman in Denmark. However, Krøyer realises that it is only a matter of time before the mental illness suffered by his mother finally affects him too. The film received several awards including the Grand Special Jury Prize and a Golden Osella for Best Cinematography at the Venice Film Festival.

When Kjell Grede was asked why he as a Swede wanted to make a film about Danish artists, he explained: "The first step, when I look back, was that I was fascinated by the thought of that remote peninsula jutting out into the sea and bathed in sunshine, and of the people gathering there. The next step comes when you consider that group of people because you realise their feelings are so important to all of us — friendship, love and beauty, all that is positive, all that is best. The third step is that when you look at them more closely, you realise that those three qualities are under threat. They are threatened with obliteration, just like the peninsula itself... Everything which means so much to us is constantly threatened by Destiny with a capital D, that same destiny we believe psychotherapists can help us overcome but which in fact tears them apart too. You can see it in the group of artists. Beauty in the paintings of the Skagen artists, it was not something intended just for the enjoyment of the upper classes. It had an important role, it was a call against a hard life, against poverty and sickness and children who died. Ours is a life of luxury when we compare our times with theirs. Beauty was something spiritual, a religious experience, a question of life and death."

Cast 
 Stellan Skarsgård – Peder Severin Krøyer
 Lene Brøndum – Lille
 Pia Vieth – Marie Krøyer
 Helge Jordal – Christian Krohg
 Morten Grunwald – Michael Ancher
  – Anna Ancher

See also 
 List of submissions to the 60th Academy Awards for Best Foreign Language Film
 List of Swedish submissions for the Academy Award for Best Foreign Language Film

References

External links 
 
 

1987 films
1987 drama films
Danish drama films
1980s Danish-language films
Norwegian drama films
Swedish drama films
1980s Swedish-language films
Films directed by Kjell Grede
Venice Grand Jury Prize winners
Films whose director won the Best Director Guldbagge Award
1987 multilingual films
Danish multilingual films
Norwegian multilingual films
Swedish multilingual films
1980s Swedish films